Upper Styria, in the Austrian usage of the term, refers exclusively to the northwestern, generally mountainous and well-wooded half of the federal state of Styria. The southwestern half of the state around the capital of Graz is known as Central Styria (Mittelsteiermark), which is further divided into Eastern and Western Styria (east and west of Graz).
Regions of Austria

Geography
Upper Styria is separated from Central Styria by the Stubalpe and Gleinalpe ranges of the Lavanttal Alps, and the Prealps East of the Mur. It is a generally rural region characterized by agriculture and tourism, except for the area between the towns of Judenburg and Mürzzuschlag, in the valley formed by the rivers Mur and Mürz, with extensive industrial sites. The area around Altaussee in the far northwest ist part of the Austrian Salzkammergut cultural landscape.

The Obersteiermark region consists of five districts:
Murau
Liezen
Murtal (former Judenburg and Knittelfeld)
Leoben
Bruck–Mürzzuschlag.

Usage in Slovenia

In Slovenian usage, the term Upper Styria (Zgornja Štajerska) refers to the whole Austrian state of Styria—as opposed to the traditional region called Lower Styria (Spodnja Štajerska), Slovenian Styria (Slovenska Štajerska) or just Styria (Štajerska), the southern third of the former Duchy of Styria which after World War I was allotted to the Kingdom of Yugoslavia according to the 1919 Treaty of Saint Germain and is today part of Slovenia.

See also

History of Styria

Geography of Austria
Styria